Szymon Janiczko (born 9 January 1930) is a Polish retired ice hockey player. He played for KTH Krynica and Legia Warsaw during his career. He also played for the Polish national team at the 1956 Winter Olympics and the 1955 World Championship. He won the Polish league championship eleven times in his career, once with Krynica in 1950 and then ten times with Legia. In 1973 he emigrated to Sweden.

References

External links

1930 births
Living people
Ice hockey players at the 1956 Winter Olympics
KTH Krynica players
Olympic ice hockey players of Poland
People from Krynica-Zdrój
Polish emigrants to Sweden
Polish ice hockey forwards